Arinze is a given name and a surname.

Notable people with the given name include:
Arinzé Kene (born 1987), Nigerian-born British actor and playwright
Arinze Stanley Egbengwu (born 1993), Nigerian artist, activist, engineer, and entrepreneur
Arinze Obiora (born 1985), Nigerian high jumper
Arinze Onuaku (born 1987), American basketball player
Emmanuel Arinze Ifeajuna (1935-1967), Nigerian army major and high jumper

Notable people with the surname include:
Francis Arinze (born 1932), Nigerian Roman Catholic cardinal 
Segun Arinze (born 1965), Nigerian actor and singer